Jasmin Koč (born 27 July 1990) is a Serbian footballer who plays as a goalkeeper for FK Jošanica.

Club career
Born in Novi Pazar, came through the same named club categories, where he also started his senior career. He made his debut for the club in the 2008–09 Serbian First League campaign. He was also loaned to the Morava Zone League side Jošanica for the next season. Returning to the club, Koč was mostly used as a back-up choice for the first half of the 2010–11 Serbian First League campaign. While he did not make any league appearance during the season, he was sanctioned with red card as a reserve keeper in the 15th fixture match against BASK. Next he released by the club in 2011, Koč moved to Sloga Sjenica and then in Pobeda Beloševac. After a half-season he spent in the Serbian League West, Koč moved back to Sjenica, where he played for the whole 2013.

At the beginning of 2014, Koč returned to his home club Novi Pazar. He was licensed for the rest of the 2013–14 Serbian SuperLiga season, as also the 2014–15 Serbian SuperLiga campaign and was eventually used as back-up choice several times, but failed to make any official appearance in the Serbian top tier football competition. In summer 2015, Koč moved on loan to Drina Zone League club Polimlje, where he spent a six-month period. Next he spent the whole 2016–17 season as a loaned player with Jošanica in the Serbian League West.

In summer 2017, Koč returned to the first squad of Novi Pazar for the 2017–18 Serbian First League campaign. After Miloš Budaković and Mladen Živković left the club, Koč started new season as the first choice under coach Marjan Živković. Following the end of season in which he appeared 26 times in both domestic competitions, Koč left the club and moved to Sloboda Užice.

5 months after signing for Sloboda Užice, he left the club again.

In February 2019, Koč joined FK Jošanica.

Playing style
Standing at 6-foot-2-and-a-half-inches (1.89 m), Koč is an offensive goalkeeper, who is also credited with sweeper-keeper role on the field. He prefers to catch the ball in front of the opponent's attackers and usually goes outside the box to kick the ball. Sometimes he also choose a dribbling to kick out the rival and get the ball. Koč personally emphasized Francesco Toldo and Manuel Neuer as players he from which he teaches keeping technique. Throughout the career, Koč is also affirmed himself as a penalty keeper. While the second spell with Sloga Sjenica, Koč kept two penalties in the game against Zlatar on 15 September 2013, after which he also elected for a player of the match.

Career statistics

References

External links
 
 
 

1990 births
Living people
Sportspeople from Novi Pazar
Association football goalkeepers
Serbian footballers
FK Novi Pazar players
FK Polimlje players
FK Sloboda Užice players
Serbian First League players